Marco Spina (born 25 January 2000) is an Italian football player. He plays for  club Gubbio on loan from Crotone.

Club career

SPAL
He was called up to the senior squad of SPAL several times during the 2018–19 Serie A season, but did not make any appearances.

Loan to Gozzano
On 23 July 2019 he joined Serie C club Gozzano on loan. On 25 August he made his professional Serie C debut for Gozzano as a 58th-minute substitute replacing Martín Rolle in a 2–2 away draw against Alessandria. He first appeared in the starting lineup on 21 September in a 2–1 away win over Pro Vercelli, he was replaced Giovanni Bruzzaniti after 53 minutes.

Vibonese
On 1 September 2020 he signed with Vibonese.

Crotone
On 31 August 2021, he signed with Serie B club Crotone and was loaned back to Vibonese for the 2021–22 season. On 26 July 2022, Spina was loaned by Gubbio.

Career statistics

Club

References

External links
 

2000 births
People from Mileto
Sportspeople from the Province of Vibo Valentia
Living people
Italian footballers
Association football midfielders
S.P.A.L. players
A.C. Gozzano players
U.S. Vibonese Calcio players
A.S. Gubbio 1910 players
Serie C players
Footballers from Calabria